Andrew Sinclair (1935–2019) was a British novelist and polymath.

Andrew Sinclair may also refer to

 Andrew Sinclair (botanist) (1794–1861), British surgeon and botanist
 Andrew Sinclair (politician) (1861–1938), Australian politician 
 Andrew Sinclair (privy counsellor) (1555–1625), Scottish-born Danish privy counsellor

See also
 Sinclair (surname)